Music from and Inspired by Desperate Housewives is the soundtrack to the ABC television series, Desperate Housewives.  It was released alongside the series in 2005 by Hollywood Records and distributed by Universal Music. As the album title implies, much of the music on the album was inspired by the series but was not in it. None of the songs had been used in the series at the time the album was released (aside from the Theme song), however "Band of Gold" and "Boom Boom" have since been included. The remainder of the album is original dialogue excerpts from the series.

Track listing 

†Hidden Bonus Track sung by the series creator, technically part of track 21.

References

External links 
 Hollywood Records' official soundtrack website

Music
Television soundtracks
2005 soundtrack albums
Pop soundtracks
Hollywood Records soundtracks
Country music soundtracks